Richard Jefferies may refer to:

* Richard Jefferies (1848–1887), English nature writer
 Richard Jefferies (curator) (born 1945), English curator of the Watts Gallery, 1985–2006
 Richard Jefferies (screenwriter) (born 1956), American screenwriter, film producer, film director and editor
 Richard Manning Jefferies (1889–1964), American state legislator and Governor of South Carolina, 1942–1943
 Dick Jefferies (died 2020), paleontologist
 Richard Jefferies (canoeist) (born 1987), British Olympic canoeist
 Richard Jefferies (businessman) (1920–2013), Australian Army officer and businessman

See also
 Richard Jeffrey (disambiguation)